Dimitrie Sturdza (in full Dimitrie Alexandru Sturdza-Miclăușanu; 10 March 183321 October 1914) was a Romanian statesman and author of the late 19th century, and president of the Romanian Academy between 1882 and 1884.

Biography
Born in Iași, Moldavia, and was educated there at the Academia Mihăileană. He continued his studies in Germany at Munich, Göttingen, Bonn, and Berlin. He took part in the political movements of the time.

Sturdza was private secretary to Prince Alexander John Cuza. He afterwards turned against the increasingly unsanctioned rule of Cuza:  He became Minister of Public Instruction in 1859, and was one of the most zealous promoters of the overthrow of Cuza. In 1866, he joined Ion Brătianu and others in the deposition of Cuza, and the election of Prince Charles of Hohenzollern (later Carol I of Romania).  He became a member of the Liberal government. In the cabinet of Bratianu, 1876–88, he repeatedly held ministerial posts.

In 1892 he was elected leader of the National Liberal Party in succession to Brătianu, and was four times Prime Minister.  For his last time in office, in 1907, Sturdza was called by King Carol I to handle the crisis created by the peasants' revolt of March. Although noted for his capacity for work, he was also a nationalist, resentful of "aliens" (in line with the anti-Jewish policies of his party), and supported blocking non-Romanians from a large number of social positions. Sturdza was a notorious antisemite, supporting measures such as the expulsion of Romanian Jews, and he was known for his opposition towards the naturalization of the Jews in Romania. He is responsible for the exile of Romanian Jewish intellectuals Moses Gaster and Lazăr Şăineanu.

He was appointed permanent secretary of the Romanian Academy, and became a recognized authority on Romanian numismatics.

His son , by then a Colonel in the Romanian Army, defected to the Germans in 1916, during the World War I.

Works
 La Marche progressive de la Russie sur le Danube (1878)
 Uebersicht der Münzen und Medaillen des Fürstentums Rumänien (1874)
 Europa, Russia, Romania (1888)
 La question des portes de fer et des cataractes du Danube (1899)
 Charles I., roi de Roumanie (1899 et seq.)
 Otu, Petre, Georgescu, Maria: Durchleuchtung eines Verrats. Der Fall des Oberst Alexandru D. Sturdza. Lektor Verlag. Hainburg. 2022.

See also
 Sturdza family

Notes

References
 Ion Luca Caragiale, Trădarea românismului! Triumful străinismului!! Consumatum est!!! (a pamphlet of the period, ridiculing the anti-Jewish stance of the Liberal Party)

1833 births
1914 deaths
Antisemitism in Romania
Politicians from Iași
Dimitrie
Chairpersons of the National Liberal Party (Romania)
Prime Ministers of Romania
Romanian Ministers of Agriculture
Romanian Ministers of Culture
Romanian Ministers of Defence
Romanian Ministers of Education
Romanian Ministers of Finance
Romanian Ministers of Foreign Affairs
Romanian Ministers of Interior
Members of the Chamber of Deputies (Romania)
Presidents of the Senate of Romania
Members of the Senate of Romania
Presidents of the Romanian Academy
Romanian Freemasons
Romanian Ministers of Public Works